Clavesana is a comune (municipality) in the Province of Cuneo in the Italian region Piedmont, located about  south of Turin and about  northeast of Cuneo.

The municipality of Clavesana contains the frazioni (subdivisions, mainly villages and hamlets) Madonna delle Neve (location of the town hall), Ghigliani, Sbaranzo, Surie, Costa Prà, Feia, Prato del Pozzo, Cravili, Ansaldi, Villero, Gorea, Chiecchi, San Pietro, San Bartolomeo, Gai, Gerino, and Tetti.

Clavesana borders the following municipalities: Bastia Mondovì, Belvedere Langhe, Carrù, Cigliè, Farigliano, Marsaglia, Murazzano, and Rocca Cigliè.

Demographic evolution

Twin towns — sister cities
Clavesana is twinned with:

  Rogno, Italy

References

External links
 www.clavesana.info/

Cities and towns in Piedmont